The Zuosuo Formation   is located in Lijiang County, Yunnan Province and is dated to the Early Triassic period.

References

Geologic formations of China
Triassic System of Asia
Geology of Yunnan